Larry Walker Benz (born January 28, 1941) is a former professional American football safety in the National Football League. He played three seasons for the Cleveland Browns.

1941 births
Living people
People from Chattanooga, Tennessee
Players of American football from Tennessee
American football safeties
Northwestern Wildcats football players
Cleveland Browns players